The Brunkeberg Tunnel in Norrmalm, Stockholm, is a 231-metre-long passageway for pedestrians through the esker Brunkebergsåsen.  The tunnel was inaugurated in 1886 by King Oscar II.

See also
 Tunnelgatan
 Geography of Stockholm

Buildings and structures in Stockholm
Tunnels in Sweden
Tunnels completed in 1886
1886 establishments in Sweden

de:Brunkebergsåsen#Brunkebergstunnel